Adrian Mann (born 12 July 1967) is an English footballer and current coach. He has played for Northampton Town among other league and non-league clubs. He played as an attacking midfielder and had a decent scoring record.

Career
Mann started his career at Northampton Town and became the club's youngest ever player at the age of 16 years and 297 in May 1984. He made over 100 appearances before spells at Torquay United, Barnet and Newport County. He joined Rushden & Diamonds at the start of their inaugural season in July 1992 and played in their first ever game against Bilston Town. He scored 44 goals in 130 games before playing for a range of Northamptonshire teams.

Manager
After his playing career Mann was appointed manager of Higham Town in February 1997. After winning the Division One title in his first season, he moved on to Woodford United in 1999 and then to Cogenhoe United for the 2002–03 season. In July 2003 he returned to Higham Town, before becoming player-manager at Long Buckby in February 2004.

After leaving Long Buckby in January 2007, he returned to Higham Town as a player, before moving on to play for Newport Pagnell Town. After a spell as assistant manager at Raunds Town, he became manager of Rushden & Higham United (which Higham Town had merged into) in November 2009.

References

1967 births
Living people
English footballers
Association football midfielders
Northampton Town F.C. players
Torquay United F.C. players
Barnet F.C. players
Rushden & Diamonds F.C. players
Kettering Town F.C. players
Long Buckby A.F.C. players
Rushden & Higham United F.C. players
Newport Pagnell Town F.C. players
English Football League players
English football managers
Rushden & Higham United F.C. managers
Woodford United F.C. managers
Cogenhoe United F.C. managers
Long Buckby A.F.C. managers